Katherine Kingsley (born 24 December 1981)  is an English actress.

Early life
Born and raised in Cambridge and schooled at Parkside Community College and Long Road Sixth Form College, Kingsley moved to London to study with the English National Opera's The Knack, before studying acting at the Bristol Old Vic Theatre School

Career
Kingsley is a three time Olivier Award Nominee. She has performed in iconic venues such as the Donmar Warehouse and the Menier Chocolate Factory, as well as the Chichester Theatre and many other West End venues. She has received critical praise for her turn as Marlene Dietrich in the Donmar production of Piaf, which led to an Olivier nomination in 2009. Furthermore, Katherine's portrayal of Lina Lamont in the 2012 Chichester Festival theatre production of Singin' In The Rain, led to a second nomination for an Olivier Theatre Award. Katherine has also been involved in The 39 Steps at the Criterion theatre.

Katherine recently played the character of Helena, opposite David Walliams and Sheridan Smith in the Michael Grandage Company's production of A Midsummer Night's Dream, the classic Shakespearean comedy. Directed by Michael Grandage himself, the production ran from 7 September to 16 November 2013 at London's Noël Coward Theatre.

On 1 November 2013, it was announced Katherine would play the role of Christine Colgate in the West End production of Dirty Rotten Scoundrels. This opened in March 2014.  She has been nominated for a Whats On Stage Award and a Manchester Theatre Award for this.

In addition to her stage work, Katherine has also worked for BBC and ITV in various TV projects including, The Bill and Casualty, Bad Education, Uncle Series 2, and the Michael Grandage film, Genius, starring Jude Law, Colin Firth, Nicole Kidman and Laura Linney. She was also the female announcer for the Battlefield One video game 

In 2016, she appeared in "Hated in the Nation", an episode of the anthology series Black Mirror.

In 2018, Kingsley played the title role in Dusty - The Dusty Springfield Musical by Jonathan Harvey based on the life of Dusty Springfield, touring the UK.

In 2021 Katherine took the part of Angela Snow in the latest reboot of "The Darling Buds of May" - "The Larkins" on ITV.

Personal life
Kingsley is married to actor/singer Dominic Tighe, whom she met while filming an advertisement for a shampoo.

Awards and nominations
2009 - Oliver Award for Best Supporting Actress in a Musical for Piaf at The Donmar Warehouse and Vaudeville Theatre.

2012 - Olivier Award for Best Supporting Actress in a Musical for Lina Lamont in Singin' In The Rain at The Palace Theatre.

2012 -  Whats On Stage Award for Best Supporting Actress in a Musical for Lina Lamont in Singin' In The Rain at The Palace Theatre.

2014 - Olivier Award for Best Supporting Actress in a Play for Helena in a Midsummer Night's Dream at The Noël Coward Theatre.

2015 - Whats On Stage Award for Best Supporting Actress in a Musical for Christine Colgate in Dirty Rotten Scoundrels at The Savoy Theatre.

2015 - Manchester Theatre Award for Best Actress in a Visiting Production.

References

External links

Katherine Kingsley's official website

1981 births
English stage actresses
Living people
English television actresses